A Tin-Type Romance is  a 1910 surviving silent film short produced by Vitagraph Studios and featuring early canine star Jean. Contrary to some sources Maurice Costello is not listed in the cast lineup.

Plot summary 
Phil and Beth meet one day at the seaside. They pass a photograph gallery where they decide to have their tin-types taken, and each one lovingly puts the other's picture into their own locket.

At their next meeting, Phil and Beth agree to marry. However, when Phil tries to prove that Beth's picture is in his locket, the catch sticks and he cannot open it. The couple fight and separate, and the film implies that each of them will now try to kill themselves.

Jean (Phil's dog) fixes the situation - she picks up Phil's locket and places it near Beth, and then returns with Beth's locket to Phil. Each one opens the other's locket, and sees that their own tin-type is indeed in there. The couple then reconcile and renew their engagement.

Cast
Leo Delaney - Phil
Florence Turner - Beth
Jean - Jean, a Dog

unbilled
Kenneth Casey - Little Boy
Adele DeGarde - Little Girl
William Shea - Bit

See also
 List of American films of 1910

References

External links

A Tin-Type Romance at Silent Era

1910 films
Vitagraph Studios short films
American silent short films
1910 short films
American black-and-white films
1910s English-language films
1910 comedy-drama films
Films directed by Laurence Trimble
1910s American films
Comedy-drama short films
Silent American comedy-drama films